Abrocoma is a genus of abrocomid rodents found in the Andes of South America, from southern Peru to central Chile. The genus contains eight species, most of which are found in isolated mountain ranges in northwestern Argentina. The oldest fossil record for the Caviomorpha appears at the late Eocene-Early Oligocene transition (37.5–31.5 mybp).

Species 
Genus Abrocoma
A. bennettii - Bennett's chinchilla rat
A. boliviensis - Bolivian chinchilla rat
A. budini - Budin's chinchilla rat
A. cinerea - ashy chinchilla rat
A. famatina - Famatina chinchilla rat
A. shistacea - Sierra del Tontal chinchilla rat
A. uspallata - Uspallata chinchilla rat
A. vaccarum - Punta de Vacas chinchilla rat or Mendozan chinchilla rat

Additionally, the species Cuscomys oblativus was formerly classified as A. oblativus, but has been reassigned.

References

Further reading 
Braun, J. K.  and M. A. Mares. 2002. Systematics of the Abrocoma cinerea species complex (Rodentia: Abrocomidae), with a description of a new species of Abrocoma. Journal of Mammalogy, 83:1-19.

 
Chinchilla rats
Taxa named by George Robert Waterhouse
Rodent genera